Morefield (A' Mhór-choille in Gaelic) is a small hamlet, lying on the northern shore of Loch Broom, 2 miles to the north of Ullapool and south of Rhue in Ross and Cromarty, and is in the Scottish council area of Highland Scotland.

In some early documents it is written as Morchyle.

Etymology
The English name is a corruption of the Gaelic meaning "the big wood".

References

Populated places in Ross and Cromarty
Hamlets in Scotland